"Pussy" is a song by American rapper Latto. It was released on July 15, 2022 through Streamcut Media and RCA Records.

Background and release 

In March 2022, Latto released her second album 777. She announced the upcoming release of "Pussy" on July 13, through Twitter, revealing that the song would be released two days later, on Friday. Shortly after Latto announced "Pussy", Latto defended herself in response to tweets claiming she was taking advantage of the overturning of Roe v. Wade to further her career. TMZ sarcastically commented that, "apparently, a rapper speaking on social... issues is... a wild concept for some people". A portion of the song's proceeds are to be donated to Planned Parenthood, an organization which seeks to uphold abortion rights.

The cover artwork for "Pussy" shows hot, pink lava spewing from a vagina, which forms the song title in a stylized typeface, behind the White House building. It was designed by Katie McIntyre.

Composition 
"Pussy" samples the 1968 song "Girls Can't Do What the Guys Do" by R&B singer Betty Wright, who died in 2020. "Pussy" has been described as a "protest song", a "female-empowering anthem", "defiant", and a "diss track". In the song, Latto derides misogynists. In its first verse, she questions men who "try to police" abortion around the world. She also speaks about double standards that women face when embracing their sexuality.

Critical reception 
Ashley Pointer of NPR wrote that Latto's "bars cut through sharper than a sword".

Music video 
The music video for "Pussy" was directed by Sara Lacombe and includes clips from protests relating to the overturning of Roe v. Wade. In other parts of the music video, Latto raps the lyrics to the song while surrounded by cats. Dora Segall of Spin called the video "excellent" and "unexpectedly adorable".

Awards and nominations

Personnel 
Credits adapted from Spotify.

 Alyssa Stephens – performer, songwriter
 Johnny Goldstein – producer, songwriter
 Clarence Henry Reid – songwriter
 Willie Clark – songwriter

References 

2022 singles
2022 songs
Latto songs
Songs written by Latto